The Men's Super-G in the 2022 FIS Alpine Skiing World Cup consisted of seven events including the final. A race originally scheduled for Lake Louise in November and then rescheduled to Bormio in December was cancelled twice and was thought unlikely to be rescheduled, potentially reducing the season to six events. However, the race was rescheduled to Wengen on 13 January 2022. After this race, 2016 champion Aleksander Aamodt Kilde of Norway had won three of the five completed races (but failed to complete one) and led the discipline; two other races were within 100 points (one race win) of his lead, although no one was closer than 60 points behind. Kilde then clinched the discipline championship for the season in front of a home crowd by winning the next-to-last race of the season in Kvitfjell.

The season was interrupted by the 2022 Winter Olympics in Beijing, China (at the Yanqing National Alpine Skiing Centre in Yanqing District) from 6–19 February 2022.  The men's Super-G was held at the "Rock" course on 8 February 2022.

The season final took place on 17 March 2022 in Courchevel, France, on the new L'Éclipse course. Only the top 25 in the Super-G discipline ranking and the winner of the Junior World Championship are eligible to compete in the final, except that athletes who have scored at least 500 points in the overall classification could participate in all specialties, and only the top 15 score points. Due to injuries, only 22 of the top 25 competed.

Standings

DNF = Did Not Finish
DNS = Did Not Start
NE = Not Eligible for finals

See also
 2022 Alpine Skiing World Cup – Men's summary rankings
 2022 Alpine Skiing World Cup – Men's Overall
 2022 Alpine Skiing World Cup – Men's Downhill
 2022 Alpine Skiing World Cup – Men's Giant Slalom
 2022 Alpine Skiing World Cup – Men's Slalom
 2022 Alpine Skiing World Cup – Men's Parallel
 World Cup scoring system

References

External links
 Alpine Skiing at FIS website

Men's super-G
FIS Alpine Ski World Cup men's Super-G discipline titles